Bite of Oregon is an annual food festival held in Portland, Oregon. Considered to be the largest in the U.S. state of Oregon, the three-day event attracts more than 50,000 attendees every year. The festival is held at Tom McCall Waterfront Park.

References

External links
 

Annual events in Portland, Oregon
Festivals in Portland, Oregon
Food and drink festivals in the United States
Tom McCall Waterfront Park